Maburea is a monotypic genus of flowering plants belonging to the family Olacaceae. The only species is Maburea trinervis.

Its native range is Guyana.

References

Olacaceae
Monotypic Santalales genera